Gunnersbury is a London Overground and London Underground station in Gunnersbury in London, England on the North London line. The station opened on 1 January 1869 and is served by District line trains to and from Richmond, and by Arriva Rail London on the London Overground network.

The station is located off Chiswick High Road (A315) and is in Travelcard Zone 3.

History
The station was opened as Brentford Road on 1 January 1869 by the London and South Western Railway (L&SWR) on a new branch line to  built from the West London Joint Railway starting north of Addison Road station (now ). The line ran through Shepherd's Bush and Hammersmith via a now closed curve and Grove Road station in Hammersmith (also now closed). A short connection was also made from the North & South Western Junction Railway (N&SWJR) line to  meeting the L&SWR line immediately north of the station. This line was served by the North London Railway (NLR).

Brentford Road station originally had four platforms; two on the line to Richmond and two serving a loop (the Chiswick Curve) which connected to the line through Kew Bridge station.

The station was given its current name in 1871.

On 1 June 1877, the District Railway (DR, now the District line) opened a short extension from its terminus at Hammersmith to connect to the L&SWR tracks east of  station. The DR then began running trains over the L&SWR tracks to Richmond. On 1 October 1877, the Metropolitan Railway (MR, now the Metropolitan line) restarted the GWR's former service to Richmond via Grove Road station.

The DR's service between Richmond, Hammersmith and central London was more direct than the NLR's route via , the L&SWR's or the MR's routes via Grove Road station or the L&SWR's other route from Richmond via . From 1 January 1894, the GWR began sharing the MR's Richmond service and served Gunnersbury once again, meaning that passengers from Gunnersbury could travel on the services of five operators.

The tracks on the Richmond branch were electrified on 1 August 1905. Whilst DR services were operated with electric trains, the L&SWR, NLR, GWR and MR services continued to be steam hauled.

MR services were withdrawn on 31 December 1906 and GWR services were withdrawn on 31 December 1910 leaving operations at Gunnersbury to the DR (by then known as the District Railway), the NLR and L&SWR. By 1916, the L&SWR's route through Hammersmith was being out-competed by the District to such a degree that the L&SWR withdrew its service between Richmond and Addison Road on 3 June 1916, leaving the District as the sole operator over that route.

In 1932, the Chiswick Curve was closed and the tracks were later removed. The site of the curve is now a housing estate known as Chiswick Village.

On 8 December 1954 the station was damaged by a tornado which ripped off the roof and injured six people.

In the 1960s the station was redeveloped with just the two platforms it currently possesses. The London Overground and London Underground services share the same tracks.

Services
Gunnersbury currently has the following National Rail (London Overground) London Underground (District Line) services, which are operated by Class 378, and S Stock
London Underground
Off-peak:
6tph to Upminster
6tph to Richmond

London Overground
Off-peak (including Sundays):
4tph to Stratford
4tph to Richmond

Arrangement
London Underground is classed as an open access operator between Richmond and Acton Lane Junction with LU purchasing individual slots on the North London line from Network Rail.

Connections
London Buses routes 110, 237, 267, 440, H91 and night route N9 serve the station.

References

External links

 London Transport Museum Photographic Archive 
 
 
 
 

District line stations
Tube stations in the London Borough of Hounslow
Railway stations in the London Borough of Hounslow
Former London and South Western Railway stations
Railway stations in Great Britain opened in 1869
Railway stations served by London Overground
Station
1869 establishments in England